Sophora macrocarpa is a species of flowering tree or shrub of the genus Sophora of the family Fabaceae. It is commonly known as mayú or mayo, and is endemic to central and southern continental Chile.

Description
The new growth is pubescent, with reddish-brown hairs. They are pinnate, each with nine to fifteen leaflets. The leaflets are dark green on the upperside and slightly glaucous underneath. The dangling clusters of flowers have long thick stems. Each flower has five pale brown calyx lobes fused into a cup, five long yellow petals and ten stamens. The fruit is a pod containing several seeds. The flowering period is August to December.

References

Trees of Chile
macrocarpa
Plants described in 1798